The seventh season of Dexter premiered on September 30, 2012. The season follows Dexter's tangles with a Ukrainian mob boss and introduces the character Hannah McKay, a mysterious widow with a green thumb and a checkered past. The season seven story arc is continued over the course of the eighth season, which premiered on June 30, 2013.

Development
On November 21, 2011, Showtime renewed Dexter for both a seventh and eighth seasons, each consisting of 12 episodes. Showtime officially announced that the seventh season would premiere Sunday, September 30, 2012. These two seasons feature a story arc spanning across both seasons. The premiere episode of Season 7 featured a flashback to Debra and Dexter's childhood. On April 24, it was confirmed that Ray Stevenson would guest star in the upcoming Season 7, and he would play the head of a Ukrainian crime syndicate who arrives in Miami determined to find out who killed one of his associates. Jason Gedrick appears in a multi-episode arc playing the manager of a Miami-area gentlemen’s club that is linked to a high-profile murder case. Yvonne Strahovski, known for starring in the NBC television series Chuck, joined Dexter as Hannah McKay, a woman with a checkered past who arrives to help Miami Metro Homicide reopen an old murder case out of mutual benefit, and becomes Dexter's new love interest.

Cast

Main 
 Michael C. Hall as Dexter Morgan
 Jennifer Carpenter as Debra Morgan
 Desmond Harrington as Joey Quinn
 C.S. Lee as Vince Masuka
 Lauren Vélez as María LaGuerta
 David Zayas as Angel Batista
 James Remar as Harry Morgan

Special guest 
 Yvonne Strahovski as Hannah McKay
 Ray Stevenson as Isaak Sirko

Recurring 
 Aimee Garcia as Jamie Batista 
 Jason Gedrick as George Novikov
 Dana L. Wilson as Angie Miller
 Andrew Kirsanov as Jurg Yeliashkevych
 Katia Winter as Nadia 
 Francisco Viana as Jake Simms
 Geoff Pierson as Tom Matthews
 Josh Cooke as Louis Greene
 Santiago Cabrera as Sal Price
 Matt Gerald as Ray Speltzer
 Nicole LaLiberte as Arlene Schram
 Brett Rickaby as Phil Bosso
 Nestor Serrano as Hector Estrada
 Billy Brown as Mike Anderson

Guest 
 Preston Bailey as Cody Bennett
 Christina Robinson as Astor Bennett 
 Enver Gjokaj as Viktor Baskov
Daniel Buran as Wayne Randall
 Beth Grant as Donna Randall
Karl Herlinger as Oleg Mickic
 Sherman Augustus as Benjamin Caffrey
 Jim Beaver as Clint McKay
 Erik King as James Doakes

Episodes

References

External links 
 
 

 
2012 American television seasons